Soia Mentschikoff (April 5, 1915 – June 18, 1984) was a Russian American lawyer, law professor, legal scholar and law school dean, best known for her work in the development and drafting of the Uniform Commercial Code. She served as dean of University of Miami School of Law. She was also the first woman to teach at Harvard Law School.

Early life
On , Mentschikoff was born in the Russian Empire to American parents.

Mentschikoff's parents returned to the United States prior to the Russian Revolution.

In 1930, at age 15, Mentschikoff began her undergraduate education at Hunter College in New York City, where she majored in English and political science. After graduating from Hunter College, she enrolled at Columbia Law School, where she completed her J.D. in 1937.

Career

Wall Street attorney
After graduating from law school, Mentschikoff worked at several Wall Street law firms, specializing in both commercial law and labor law, particularly in arbitration and mediation. She was one of the first women to become a partner at a large New York City firm, having served as a partner at Spence, Windels, Walser, Hotchkiss & Angell, which was later renamed Spence, Hotchkiss, Parker & Duryee.

Uniform Commercial Code
While Mentschikoff was still a student at Columbia, she met Karl Llewellyn, a professor there at the time. In 1942, when Llewellyn was appointed by the American Law Institute to be the chief reporter in drafting the Uniform Commercial Code, Mentschikoff was named his assistant. She worked as Llewellyn's research assistant until 1949, when she was named associate chief reporter. In 1954, she became a consultant to the permanent editorial board for the UCC.

Harvard and University of Chicago
Mentschikoff married Llewellyn in 1946. In 1947, she accepted a teaching position at Harvard Law School, becoming the first woman to ever teach there.  In 1951, both were offered teaching positions at the University of Chicago Law School. Due to the school's anti-nepotism rule, Llewellyn was named a "professor," while Mentschikoff was given the title "professorial lecturer." Mentschikoff held this position until Llewellyn's death in 1962, at which point she was made a full professor.

While at the University of Chicago, Mentschikoff became involved in the development of international commercial law. In 1964, she represented the United States at a diplomatic conference in The Hague, where she pushed for a uniform law governing international sales and arbitration.

University of Miami
In 1967, Mentschikoff began teaching one semester each year at University of Miami School of Law. She was elected a Fellow of the American Academy of Arts and Sciences in 1972. She finally left the University of Chicago for good in 1974, when she was named dean of University of Miami School of Law, a position she would hold until her retirement in 1982. During her tenure as dean, she worked to limit enrollment, improve the law library, and hire quality faculty. She also co-wrote a textbook with Irwin Stotzky which is still used by students enrolled in Legal Elements.

Death
Mentschikoff died in Coral Gables, Florida, on June 18, 1984. In her honor, the University of Miami Law School published a series of essays regarding her career and contributions in its Inter-American Law Review.

References

External links
 Guide to Soia Mentschikoff's papers from the University of Chicago library
 Biography of Soia Mentschikoff from the University of Miami School of Law
 Picture of Mentschikoff from the Columbia University Law Library
Guide to the Soia Mentschikoff Papers 1913-1987 at the
 
 University of Chicago Special Collections Research Center

1915 births
1984 deaths
American academic administrators
American legal scholars
Columbia Law School alumni
Fellows of the American Academy of Arts and Sciences
Harvard Law School faculty
Hunter College alumni
Emigrants from the Russian Empire to the United States
Deans of law schools in the United States
People from Coral Gables, Florida
Russian academic administrators
University of Chicago Law School faculty
University of Miami faculty
Women academic administrators
American women legal scholars
20th-century American women lawyers
20th-century American lawyers
American women academics
20th-century American academics